Cocceji is a surname, sometimes used with the nobiliary particle "von", meaning "of", and may refer to:

 Heinrich von Cocceji (1644–1719), German jurist
 Samuel von Cocceji (1679–1755), German jurist

German-language surnames